Harrison School in St. Louis, Missouri was built in a Romanesque style in 1895.  It was listed on the National Register of Historic Places in 2007.

It was closed as a school in 1996.  It was put up for sale by the school district in 2003 and sold in 2007.  In 2008 the project was awarded four percent tax credits for its rehabilitation.

References

School buildings completed in 1899
Schools in St. Louis
School buildings on the National Register of Historic Places in Missouri
National Register of Historic Places in St. Louis
1899 establishments in Missouri